Dawning can refer to:

 Dawning Information Industry Company Limited, a Chinese supercomputer manufacturer, also known as Sugon
 Dawning (album)
 Dawn, the time of day

See also
 Dawn (disambiguation)